Balcony Bridge is a natural arch in the U.S. state of California. It is located in Siskiyou County.

References

Natural arches of California